College Confidential may refer to:
 College Confidential (company), a college admissions counseling company founded in 2001
 College Confidential (film), a 1960 B-movie drama